The term XTI can refer to the following:

 Leatherman Charge XTi, a premium multi-tool made by Leatherman
 XTI, the X/Open Transport Interface
 Canon Rebel XTi, the third generation Canon Rebel dSLR